Alessandro Michele (born 25 November 1972) is an Italian fashion designer who most recently served as the creative director of Gucci, the Italian fashion luxury house where he had been working since 2002. Known for his maximalist designs, Alessandro Michele revived Gucci's popularity most notably with a Geek-Chic aesthetic. He had been responsible for all of Gucci's collections and global brand image from January 2015 until he stepped down from the role in November 2022.

Biography

Early life 
Alessandro Michele grew up in Rome. His father was an Alitalia technician, and his mother an assistant to a movie executive.

In the early 1990s, Alessandro Michele completed his studies of fashion design at the Accademia di Costume e di Moda in Rome, where he learned to design both theatrical costumes and fashion wear.

Career 

In 1994, Alessandro Michele left Rome to work in Les Copains, an Italian knitwear firm based in Bologna. Three years later, he joined Silvia Venturini Fendi and Karl Lagerfeld at luxury house Fendi. He worked with Frida Giannini and was appointed senior accessories designer, in charge of the brand’s leather goods.

In 2002, Tom Ford, Gucci's creative director from 1994 to 2004, invited Alessandro Michele to work at the firm's London-based design office. He was originally in charge of the company’s handbag designs. In 2006, Alessandro Michele was named senior designer of Gucci leather goods, and in 2011, he was promoted associate creative director to Frida Giannini, creative director of Gucci since 2005. In 2014, the Italian designer also became creative director of Richard Ginori, the Florentine porcelain brand acquired by Gucci in June 2013.

Creative director of Gucci 
In January 2015, Marco Bizzarri asked Alessandro Michele to act as interim creative designer for the January menswear show, giving him a week to reshape Frida Giannini's original designs. Michele accepted the challenge and introduced a “new Gucci: nonconformist, romantic, intellectual”. Two days later, Kering appointed Alessandro Michele creative director of Gucci, with the goal to reinvent Gucci’s props amid deflating sales. A month later, Michele introduced a "sophisticated, intellectual and androgynous feel" for Gucci during his first women's collection show. 

While creating iconic products, such as the Dionysus handbag, Alessandro Michele also reintroduced Gucci classics including the double-G logo. He moved away from Tom Ford's "Sexy Gucci" props and feminized Gucci’s menswear ("you can be more masculine showing your femininity"). He reused the "My Body My Choice" slogan, the embroidered uterus design, and the "22.05.1978" date (the date on which abortion became protected by Italian courts), transforming the brand into a postgender proposition. He added a dramatic Renaissance component to Gucci’s spirit, replaced the modernist furniture of the Palazzo Alberini-Cicciaporci (Gucci’s design headquarters in Rome) with antiques, and chose buildings of historic significance for his theatrical shows.

In 2016, for the Gucci Museum in Florence, Alessandro Michele curated two additional rooms dedicated to Tom Ford's collections. Since the 2018 opening of the Gucci Wooster Bookstore in New York, Michele seasonally contributes to the curation of the shop’s items. In October 2018, he co-curated with Maurizio Cattelan the 2-month Gucci art exhibition "The Artist is Present" in Shanghai.

In 2019, Alessandro Michele revived Gucci's Beauty collection, and Gucci launched its first fine jewelry collection, which he designed.

Work
Alessandro Michele’s father was also an avid artist who often took his son out to the museums. His family encouraged his interest in fashion at an early age. As a teenager, he read British magazines and was a fan of London’s post-punk and New Romantic street style. His designs have been described as eclectic, flamboyant and maximalist, almost psychedelic, and drawn from several influences that span from cinema and theatrics to post-punk, crochet and glamour.

Alessandro Michele refers to himself as an art archaeologist - historicist of garments - rather than a creative director, considering that clothes are meaningless without a historic context. In his fashion Renaissance process, he explores how adornment and embellishment was used over the centuries, bringing a kaleidoscopic mix of times and cultures that resonates with Gilles Deleuze's idea of "assemblage".

Personal life
Michele is openly gay. He lives in Rome with his longtime partner, professor of urban planning, Giovanni Attili.

Prizes and awards 
 2015: International Fashion Designer Of The Year Award at the British Council Fashion Awards
2016: Council of Fashion Designers of America Awards
2016 International Accessories Designer of the Year Award at the British Council Fashion Awards
2016: GQ Men Of The Year Award for best designer
2017: Listed in Hypebeast's HB100
2017: Time 100 Most Influential People

See also 
 Gucci
 List of Italian designers

References

External links 
 Official biography

Fashion designers from Rome
Italian fashion designers
Living people
Gucci people
1972 births
Kering people
Italian gay artists
LGBT fashion designers
Gucci